Bắc Ninh is a province of Vietnam, located in the Red River Delta of the northern part of the country. It is the smallest province of Vietnam by area and is situated to the east of the nation's capital, Hanoi, and borders Bắc Giang province, Hưng Yên province, Hải Dương province and Hanoi. The province covers an area of 822.71 square kilometres and as of 2022 it had a population of 1.488.250. The province's name literally means "northern serenity".

The province is rich in culture and is known nationally for Quan họ folk music. Quan họ was recognized as an Intangible Cultural Heritage by the UNESCO in 2009.

Bắc Ninh has a Human Development Index of 0.768 (high), ranking seventh among all municipalities and provinces of Vietnam.

History
During the Hồng Bàng period, Bắc Ninh belonged to bộ Vũ Ninh (bộ is at a local level the highest administrative unit under the dynasties of the Hùng kings). Under the Lý and Trần dynasties, it belonged to lộ Bắc Ninh; it belonged to thừa tuyên Kinh Bắc under the Lê dynasty and then changed into trấn Kinh Bắc and Bắc Ninh. Under Emperor Minh Mạng of the Nguyễn dynasty, it was renamed Bắc Ninh province in 1831.

During the Democratic Republic of Vietnam, Bắc Ninh province and the neighboring Bắc Giang province were united as Hà Bắc province on 27 October 1962. During the Socialist Republic of Vietnam, on 6 November 1996 at the 10th Session of the 9th National Congress, Hà Bắc province was separated into two provinces, Bắc Ninh and Bắc Giang. The administrative system of Bắc Ninh province has operated since 1 January 1997.

Geography

Topography
Bắc Ninh has a rather even and flat terrain, mainly sloping from north to south and west to east, causing currents to flow down into the Đuống and Thái Bình Rivers. Field areas are 3-7m high and hill and mountain areas are 300-400m high above sea level. Its hills and mountains only make up 0.53 per cent of its natural area, mainly in the two districts of Quế Võ and Tiên Du. Also, there are shallow depressions along dykes under the districts of Gia Bình, Lương Tài, Quế Võ and Yên Phong.

Natural resources
The province's total natural land area is 822.7 km2, in which agricultural land, forestry land, specialized and residential land and unused land account for 54%, 0.7%, 31% and 14.3% respectively. The province's mineral reserve is limited: mainly construction materials such as clay in Quế Võ and Tiên Du, sandstone in Thị Cầu, Vũ Ninh, Bắc Ninh town and peat in Yên Phong.

Climate 
Bắc Ninh features a warm humid subtropical climate (Köppen Cwa) with plentiful precipitation. Bắc Ninh is located in a tropical monsoon region. The annual average temperature is 24 °C. The highest is 30 °C in July; the lowest is 6 °C in January. The province experiences the typical climate of northern Vietnam, where summers are hot and humid, and winters are, by national standards, relatively cold and dry. Summers, lasting from May to September, are hot and humid, receiving the majority of the annual  of rainfall. The winters, lasting from November to March, are relatively mild, dry (in the first half) or humid (in the second half), while spring (April) can bring light rains. Autumn (October) is the best time of the year in terms of weather. The average annual sunshine is 1,530-1,776 hours, while the relative humidity is 79%.

Administration divisions 

Bắc Ninh is subdivided into 8 district-level sub-divisions:

 4 districts

 Gia Bình
 Lương Tài
 Tiên Du
 Yên Phong

 2 Towns
 Quế Võ
 Thuận Thành
 2 provincial city:
 Bắc Ninh (capital)
Từ Sơn

Bac Ninh province has a population of 2022, 1.488.250 people with 8 district-level administrative units, including 2 cities, 2 towns and 4 districts with 126 commune-level administrative units, including 52 wards, 4 towns and 70 communes. [23]

The Bắc Ninh province People's Committee is a 9-member executive council for the province. The current chairman is Nguyễn Nhân Chiến. There are several vice chairmen and chairwomen on the committee with responsibility for various province departments. The legislative branch of the province government is called the People's Council and consists of 50 deputies. Both the committee and the council are subordinate to the province's Communist Party, currently led by Party Secretary Trần Văn Túy. The chairman of the People's Committee is the No. 2 position in the city government while chairman of the People's Council is No. 3.

Table of local government districts

Demographics

In terms of land area, Bắc Ninh is the smallest of all Vietnamese provinces (and in fact, is smaller than any of the five province-level municipalities). It is, however, home to a relatively large number of people for its size, having the highest population density of any province. On average, there are over 1,200 people for every square kilometre of land in Bắc Ninh.

According to the census of 1 April 2009, the population was 1,024,472 with a density of 1,262 people/km2, 5 times the national average. There are 27 ethnic groups in the province, of these ethnic Vietnamese comprised 99.67%.

Transport
 
Bắc Ninh is situated about 30 kilometres from Hanoi and Nội Bài International Airport, and some 100 km from Haiphong, Hạ Long, Cái Lân Port and Lạng Sơn border gate.
 Roadway: The province has over 3,906.8 km of road, 104.8 km of which are from 4 routes of national roads of No. 1 (old and new routes) (linking Hanoi – Bắc Ninh – Lạng Sơn), No. 18 (Nội Bài – Bắc Ninh – Hạ Long), No. 38 (Bắc Ninh – Hải Dương – Haiphong) and the Nội Bài-Hạ Long Expressway. 251 km are from routes of provincial roads, 404 km from district and urban areas, and some 3,147 km from commune and hamlet roads.
Waterway: Three big rivers flowing through Bắc Ninh comprise the Cầu River which is 42 km long, Thái Bình River which is 17 km long, and Đuống River which is 42 km long. Also, there is Đáp Cầu Port, and two special ports of the Cầu River.
Railway: A 20-km Hanoi-Lang Son Rail Route runs through Bắc Ninh and 4 railway stations of Từ Sơn, Lim, Bắc Ninh, and Thị Cầu. A 39-km Yên Viên-Phả Lại Rail Route is planned to be constructed in the districts of Tiên Du, Từ Sơn, Quế Võ and Bắc Ninh City.
Power supply: Power is stably supplied for production and domestic consumption, comprising 120 km of 110kV national grid, 249.3 km of 35-kV electric lines and 3,700 km of 0.4kV electric lines. All districts and cities have national grid and all households use electricity.

Economy

Bắc Ninh province lies on the major traffic artery linking Vietnam and China – which is a strongly growing market and expected to be larger as the China - ASEAN free trade area is formed. It also lies on the Nanning - Lạng Sơn - Hanoi - Hai Phong and Nanning - Singapore economic corridors, the Hanoi capital city planning area and the busy Hanoi - Hai Phong - Quảng Ninh economic development triangle.

Bắc Ninh province is known as a light point in industrial development, and has been lifting rapidly with long steps of industrialisation – modernisation.
Bắc Ninh has 15 industrial parks with a total area of 7,681 ha, of which nine have operated effectively. The industrial parks have lured 272 foreign direct investment (FDI) projects totaling to over $3.7 billion, including those invested by Canon, Samsung, P&Tel, Sumitomo,  Foxconn, ABB, Orion, PepsiCo and Nokia. They have attracted 254 domestic projects with a total registered capital of over $1 billion and a labour force of more than 83,000. Bắc Ninh has as many as 120 handicraft-producing villages, 62 of which are involved in producing traditional products such as copper casting (Đại Bái-Gia Bình), iron and steel (Đa Hội-Từ Sơn), and wooden products (Đồng Kỵ-Kim Sơn). They have the upper hand and high potential to contribute to Bắc Ninh's economic development.

In 2015, the Gross Regional Domestic Product (GRDP) increased 8.7% compared with 2014. The economic structure shifted in the right direction with agro-forestry-fishery accounting for 5.3%, industry and construction for 75.6% and service 19.1%. Industrial production value was estimated at VND 610 trillion, up 9.1%. The total retail sale of goods and consumer service revenue reached over VND 39.7 trillion, up 15.4%, the total export turnover of goods was estimated at USD 23.2 billion, up 6.4%, the total state budget revenue in the province was estimated at VND 14,500 billion, up 14.3%.

Culture 

Bắc Ninh is hometown of not only Kinh Dương Vương – the very first king of ancient Việt ethic, but also of eight Kings of the Lý Dynasty. Many historical and cultural relics such as Đô Temple (where 8 kings of the Lý Dynasty are worshipped), Dâu Pagoda, the first pagoda in Vietnamese history, Bút Tháp Pagoda (an ancient pagoda), Phật Tích Pagoda, Dâu Pagoda and the local Literature Temple. Bắc Ninh hosts thousands of local festivals from small to large, having special meaning such as the Dâu Pagoda festival, the Lim festival, the Đô Temple festival and the Bà Chúa Kho temple festival.

The quan họ style has its origins in what now constitutes the Bắc Ninh province and was first recorded in the 13th century. It has traditionally been associated with the spring festivals that follow the celebration of Tết (the Vietnamese New Year). Quan họ is recognised as the Intangible Cultural Heritage by the UNESCO in 2009.

The village of Đông Hồ in the province of Bắc Ninh is known as the center of production of traditional Vietnamese woodblock prints (Đông Hồ painting), which are sold throughout Vietnam in time for the Lunar New Year (Tết) celebrations.

Hồ chicken (gà Hồ) is a breed originating in Bắc Ninh Province. Gà Hồ is a distinctly Vietnamese rare breed of chicken, familiar as a symbol in Vietnam. According to folklore, the chicken (particularly the roosters) have the five qualities of a man of honour: literacy, martial arts, physical strength, humanity and loyalty. The Gà Hồ rooster rising himself to welcome the sun is used as a symbol for the 3rd Asian Indoor Games, which were held in Vietnam from 30 October till 8 November 2009. The symbolism in the context of the AIGs is that the rising rooster is linked to the readiness of the sports industry of Vietnam to host this major event.

List of festivals in Bắc Ninh Province:

Education

Primary and secondary education 
Bắc Ninh's education system is divided into 5 categories: pre-primary, primary, intermediate, secondary, and higher education.

Kindergarten is for children from 2 to 5 years old to form thinking skills (not all children must learn this level).

Primary school level is also called level I, starting at 6 years old. Level I consists of 5 grades, from grade 1 to grade 5. This is required for all students.

Secondary level education: Level II includes 4 grades, from grade 6 to grade 9. Students must learn various school subjects such as: Mathematics, Physics, Chemistry (grades 8 and 9), Biology, Technology, written language, History, Geography, Education Citizens, Foreign Language, Health and Parenting Music - Visual Arts.

In addition students have some information required such as: education outside the classroom on time, direction of education (grade 9) and use of school. To study the higher level students participate in the examination enrollment.

Further secondary school: Level III consists of 3 grades, from grade 10 to grade 12. To graduate level III, students must participate in the graduation exam secondary school of education and training. Notable high schools in Bắc Ninh include Bắc Ninh High School for the Gifted, Thuận Thành No 1 High School, among others. Though the former schools are all public, private education is also available in Bắc Ninh.

Students who want to study in schools-public school must attend an examination of birth. The exam is held every year, by the Department of Education and Training of the local lead. At this level, students also study subjects similar to those in middle school. However, students in secondary school also take a number of other activities such as business and vocational.

Higher education
Bắc Ninh has universities and colleges, vocational training skill secondary schools and centres providing investors with labour sources suitable for demand of high technical qualifications of enterprises.

Bắc Ninh University of Physical Education and Sports (UPES1)
Kinh Băc University
Bắc Hà International University
People's Police University of Technology and Logistics - T36 (Đại học Kỹ thuật - Hậu cần Công an nhân dân)
Academy of Policy and Development
Dong A University of Technology

Notable people

Cao Lỗ
Lý Thái Tổ
Lý Thái Tông
Lý Thánh Tông
Lý Nhân Tông
Lý Thần Tông
Lý Anh Tông
Lý Cao Tông
Lý Huệ Tông
Lý Chiêu Hoàng
Lý Đạo Thành
Lý Long Tường
Lý Tường Tuấn
Ỷ Lan
Thích Huyền Quang
Nguyễn Văn Cừ
Ngô Gia Tự, Ngô Tất Tố 
Cao Bá Quát 
Hoàng Quốc Việt 
Nguyễn Mạnh Hùng
Dương Công Minh
Lê Quang Đạo
Lê Văn Thịnh
Vạn Hạnh
Andrew Dũng-Lạc
Hoàng Anh Tuấn
 General Phạm Văn Trà
Trần Đức Thảo
Hàn Thuyên
Vũ Trinh
Nguyễn Du
Hồ Xuân Hương
Nguyễn Gia Thiều
Kim Lân
Hoàng Cầm
Nguyễn Quảng Tuân
Vũ Giáng Hương 
Phạm Xuân Yêm
Đàm Thanh Sơn

International relations
Angola
The leader also expressed his wish to share the province's experience with Angola in investment promotion, contributing to fostering the friendship between the two peoples. They signed a memorandum of understanding on cooperation in forestry exploitation and processing, and the supply of construction workers in oil and gas to the African country.
Cambodia
Cambodia wants to tighten cooperation in many fields with Vietnam, including the northern province of Bắc Ninh, to deepen solidarity and friendship between the two countries. Cambodia will continue receiving Vietnam and Bắc Ninh Province's assistance in corruption prevention, meeting citizens and settlement of complaints and denouncements.
South Korea
South Korean investment projects in northern Bắc Ninh province have greatly contributed to the development of the province's key industrial sectors.
Laos
Bac Ninh province committed to helping Houaphanh province upgrade its infrastructure for agricultural production, mining and processing industries. Bắc Ninh will also help Houaphanh to build a primary school and grant scholarships to students from Houaphanh studying in Vietnam.
Japan
The Vietnam – Japan Friendship Organization held a prayer for peace at Bắc Ninh Provincial Museum. A delegation from the ASEAN-Japan Centre visited Bắc Ninh on 24 October 2012 to learn about the investment environment in this northern province.

References

External links

Bắc Ninh province official website 
Bắc Ninh Industrial Zones Authority website
Cities Clean Air for Smaller Cities in the ASEAN Region: Road Map Towards a Clean Air Plan for Bac Ninh, Vietnam 

 
Provinces of Vietnam